The River Monks are an American folk/pop/indie rock band from Des Moines, Iowa.

History
The River Monks formed at the beginning of 2010 in Des Moines, Iowa when songwriters Ryan Stier and Nicholas Frampton, and percussionist Joel Gettys began collaborating on Stier's works. They recorded their first album in Creston, Iowa while some of the band members studied and/or taught music at Southwestern Community College (SWCC). There were member additions to the band; Drew Rauch on bass, Mallory Stanek on trumpet and accordion, and Tommy Boynton as a multi-instrumentalist. In March 2011 they released their debut LP, Jovials, and toured nationally. 
In 2013 they began recording their second LP in Nashville, TN at Frampton's home, Peachtree Studio, with engineer Brooks Edwards. They continued recording in Iowa at Pinnacle Recording with engineer Darren Hushak. Home Is The House, the group's second LP, was released in May 2014 to critical acclaim.

In 2014, the band was listed by Paste Magazine as one of "12 Iowa bands you should listen to right now."

Band members
Ryan Stier (vocals, guitars, banjo) 
Nick Frampton (guitars, vocals, percussion, ukulele)
Joel Gettys (drums, auxiliary percussion, glockenspiel, vocals)
Drew Rauch (bass, vocals)
Mallory Heggen (trumpet, percussion, accordion, vocals)
Tommy Boynton (banjo, ukulele, percussion, guitar, vocals)

Discography
Studio albums
Home Is The House (2014)
Jovials (2011)

References

Musical groups from Des Moines, Iowa
2010 establishments in Iowa
Musical groups established in 2010
American folk musical groups
American pop music groups
Indie rock musical groups from Iowa